Jegaatha (born 3 January 1956) is a famous Tamil author of over 500 short stories, 30 small novels, 10 novels, 100 poems and more than 300 books on various titles. He has also contributed more than 44 Tamil periodicides, ceylon periodicals, Internet periodicals and radio broadcasts.

Creative works

Short story collections

Small novel collections

Novels

Poetry

Tamil periodical contributions

Translation novels

Fictions on various titles

Drama

Music

Cinema

History

Theology

Literature

Epic

Law

Computer

Sports

G.K

Siddha

Other media contributions 

 Many short stories were contributed to Madurai, Tuticorin radio stations and were praised by Radio fans.

Awards and contributions 

 "Ilakkiya Sindhanai" award to his "Koottanjoru" Sirukadaihal.
 "Therunai" short story was praised by Ananda vikadan itself.
 "Vizhuthugal" short story was praised by "Idayam pesugiradhu" weekly for "Natchathira sirukadhai".
 "Ooothapoo" short story was praised by "Saavi" weekly for its "Vaanavil sirukadhai potti".
 "Iravu nerathu magudihal" was praised by "Thai" weekly for its sirukathai potti.
 "Samuthira Kumararhal" novel was selected as one of the best novel of 1980's by TKC.This novel was accepted by Madurai Kamaraj University for M.A. subject.
 "Viduthalai vengai" novel was accepted by Annamalai University for M.Phil.
 "Viradha paruvam" - A short story collection was accepted by Pachaiyappa college,Chennai for M.Phil.
 "Velviyil Mulaitha vidhaihal" -A short story collection was accepted by Annamalai University for M.phil.
 "Jegaadhavin Sirukadhaihal" collection was accepted by Sri saradha women college(Salem),Fathima College for M.phil.

References

Sources 

The details have been gathered from the following publications.
 India Today
 Ananda Vikadan
 Kumudham
 Dhinamani
 Nakkeran
 Saravanna store
 Kunguma chimzh
 Thayin manikkodi
 Mugavai murasu
 Thodarum 
 Saandror Murasu
 Niraimathi
 Ambala, Internet
 Nivedhini(Ceylon)

1956 births
Living people
Tamil writers